Honda Australia Pty. Ltd, commonly known as Honda Australia, is an Australian wholly owned subsidiary of Honda based in Tullamarine, Victoria, Australia.

The Honda brand arrived in Australia in the mid 1950s, when independent firms imported Honda motorcycles. By the 1960s, motorcycles were joined by Honda vehicles, notably the tiny Honda S600 sports car and Honda N360 and later the Accord and Civic.

In the late 1960s, Honda Motor Co. decided on a national approach to motor vehicle sales.  On February 4, 1969, Japanese Manager Hidehiko Shiomi set up Honda Australia Pty Ltd.  It was the first Honda subsidiary in the world set up primarily to sell cars. By 1987, all of the private distributors of Honda motorcycles and power equipment had relinquished distribution rights and Honda Australia became sole importer of all Honda products.

In 1991, motorcycles and power equipment were relocated to Campbellfield to become Honda MPE, while Honda Motor Vehicles remained at Tullamarine.

In recent years Honda Australia has supported motorsport teams such as Wall Racing in TCR Australia. It also supported Jenson Button in his FWD lap record attempt at Mount Panorama.

People
Hiroyuki Shimizu is the (Managing Director and CEO) with effect from 1 April 2017. Mr Shimizu served as Director and Vice President, Honda Automobile (Thailand) in his last assignment.

Stephen Collins' current role is Director of Honda Australia, a position he has held since October 2012. Mr Collins is also Chairman of The Honda Foundation.

Ms. Carolyn McMahon is the Director of Honda Australia Pty Ltd with effect from 1 April 2017.

Models and manufacturing 

 Honda HR-V – Japan (Honda Yorii Factory)
 Honda Civic – Japan (Honda Saitama Factory)
 Honda Accord – Thailand (Honda Ayutthaya Plant)
 Honda CR-V – Thailand (Honda Ayutthaya Plant)

Nationally there are 107 Honda dealerships across Australia:

 Metro - 43
 Provincial - 29
 Rural - 35

Former models and manufacturing 
 Honda Odyssey – Japan (Honda Sayama Factory)
 Honda Jazz –Thailand (Honda Ayutthaya Plant)
 Honda City – Thailand (Honda Ayutthaya Plant)
 Honda Civic Type R – England (Swindon, United Kingdom)
 Honda NSX – USA (Honda of America)

Sales 
Launching within Australia in 1969, Honda has been a mainstay within Top 10 selling brands. In the 1990s, Honda established itself as quickly growing brand, and, within the 2000s, Honda Australia excelled itself, reaching 50,000 units between 2006 and 2008, and again in 2018, gaining it a higher position on the top selling brands charts. Throughout its establishment, Civic, and later CR-V and Accord Euro, nameplates have been very popular with Australian buyers, with each selling over 400,000, 125,000 and 60,000 vehicles (respectively) throughout their tenancy.

Awards 
Wheels Car Of The Year

 Honda Accord - 1977
 Honda Prelude - 1987 
 Honda NSX - 1991
 Honda Odyssey - 1995
 Honda Accord Euro - 2009
 Honda CR-Z - 2011

Drive Car Of The Year

 Honda Odyssey - Best People Mover 2004, 2005, 2006, 2009, 2010, 2011, 2012
 Honda Accord Euro - Best Medium Car 2006
 Honda Civic - Interior design 2006
 Honda Accord V6 - Car of the Year 2008

Australia's Best Cars

 Honda Odyssey - Best People Mover 2004, 2005, 2006, 2007 
 Honda S2000 - Best Sports Car 2000
 Honda Accord V6 - Best Luxury Car under $57,000 in 2003, 2004
 Honda Civic - Best Mid Size Car under $28,000 in 2006, 2007

NRMA

 Honda Integra - Best Sports Car under $47,116 in 1993          
 Honda Integra - Best Sports Car under $50,000 in 1994
 Honda Odyssey - Best Family Wagon 1996, 1997, Best Passenger Wagon 1997, 1998
 Honda Civic - Best Small Medium Car

RACV

 Honda Odyssey - Best Passenger Van 1995, 1996, 1997, Best People Mover 1995, 1998
 Honda Prelude - Best Sports Car under $50,000 in 1994
 Honda S2000 - Best Sports Car over $56,000 in 1999

RAA

 Honda Odyssey - Car of the year 1995

RACQ

 Honda S2000 - Best Sports Car 1999

Carsales

 Honda Accord Euro - Prestige Car of the Year 2003, 2004, 2005
 Honda Jazz - Small car of the Year 2003

Wheels and Which Car Annual Quality Ratings

 Honda Accord - 1994, 1995

Peoples Car of Australia Award

 Honda Civic - 1991

Australian International Design Award

 Honda CR-Z - 2012
 Honda Civic Type R - 2008

Motor Performance Car Of The Year

 Honda Civic Type R - 2018

References 

Honda
Australian companies established in 1969
Vehicle manufacturing companies established in 1969
Australian subsidiaries of foreign companies
Car manufacturers of Australia
Australian brands